Kami is a French comics publisher. It publishes manga, manhwa and manfra. It cancelled the publication of most of its titles in 2010.

Titles

 Aflame Inferno
 Aqua (アｸア)
 Aria (アリア)
 Beast of East
 Birth
 Chroniques de Lodoss
 DearS (ディアーズ)
 Desert Coral (デザート・コーラル)
 Edison Fantasy Science
 Erementar Gerad (エレメンタル ジェレイド)
 G-Plus
 Gate Keepers (ゲートキーパーズ)
 Innocent W.
 Junkyard Magnetic
 Ka-Kong
 Le Loup de Hinata
 Loki
 Mille et Une Nuits (천일야화)
 Nambul (남벌)
 Napoleon (ナポレオン)
 L'Officiel du Manga 2007
 Opéra de Pékin
 Peacemaker Kurogane (Peace Maker 鐵)
 Peace Maker (Kurogane prequel)
 Princess Princess (プリンセス・プリンセス)
 Rai
 Robot (ArtBook)
 Slasher
 Sorcière de l'ouest (西の善き魔女)
 Vassalord
 XS
 xxxHolic Official FanBook (×××ホリック Official Fanbook)

See also
List of manga publishers

References

Comic book publishing companies of France
Manga distributors
Manhwa distributors